Lost Horizon is a graphic adventure video game developed by Animation Arts and published by Deep Silver for Microsoft Windows, iOS, Android and Nintendo Switch.

Reception

The PC and iOS versions received "favourable" reviews according to the review aggregation website Metacritic.

Sequel
A sequel titled Lost Horizon 2 was released on 1 October 2015 and it takes place 20 years after the events of the first game.

References

External links
 

2010 video games
Android (operating system) games
Deep Silver games
Embracer Group franchises
IOS games
Nintendo Switch games
Point-and-click adventure games
Video games developed in Germany
Video games set in 1936
Video games set in Berlin
Video games set in Germany
Video games set in India
Video games set in Hong Kong
Video games set in Morocco
Video games set in Tibet
Windows games
Single-player video games